Shin Young-Soo (Hangul: 신영수; born ) is a South Korean male volleyball player. He currently plays for the  Incheon Korean Air Jumbos.

References

External links
 Shin Young-soo at the International Volleyball Federation (FIVB)

1982 births
Living people
South Korean men's volleyball players
Asian Games medalists in volleyball
Volleyball players at the 2010 Asian Games
Medalists at the 2010 Asian Games
Asian Games bronze medalists for South Korea
Universiade medalists in volleyball
Universiade gold medalists for South Korea
Sportspeople from Daejeon
21st-century South Korean people